The abbreviation SIMT may mean:

 School of International Management and Technology
 Stuttgart Institute of Management and Technology
 Single instruction, multiple threads, relates to single instruction, multiple data (SIMD)
 Saigon Institute of Management and Technology
 The South Island Main Trunk Railway in New Zealand